E. W. Doss served as a member of the 1869–1871 California State Assembly, representing the 4th District.

References

Year of birth missing
Place of birth missing
Year of death missing
Place of death missing
Members of the California State Assembly
19th-century American politicians